Robert Ernest Babcock (born August 25, 1949) is a former Major League Baseball pitcher who played for three seasons.

External links
, or Retrosheet, or Pura Pelota (Venezuelan Winter League)

1949 births
Living people
Asheville Orioles players
Baseball players from Pennsylvania
Charleston Charlies players
Denver Bears players
Gulf Coast Expos players
Gulf Coast Pirates players
Major League Baseball pitchers
Memphis Blues players
Navegantes del Magallanes players
American expatriate baseball players in Venezuela
Peninsula Whips players
People from New Castle, Pennsylvania
Québec Carnavals players
Rochester Red Wings players
Salt Lake City Gulls players
Texas Rangers players
Tucson Toros players
Tulsa Drillers players
West Palm Beach Expos players